M204 or M-204 may refer to:

Model 204, a DBMS for IBM and compatible mainframes
M-204 (Michigan highway), a state highway in Michigan